The Cummins X-series engine is an Inline (Straight)-6 diesel engine produced by Cummins for heavy duty trucks and motorcoaches, replacing the N14 in 2001 when emissions regulations passed by the EPA made the engine obsolete. Originally called the "Signature" series engine, the ISX uses the "Interact System" (hence the "IS" which is the moniker for the full authority, on highway fuel system Cummins pioneered) to further improve the engine. This engine is widely used in on highway and vocational trucks and is available in power ranging from 430 hp all the way to 620 hp 2050 lb-ft. The QSX is the off-highway version of the ISX with the Q standing for Quantum. The QSX is used for industrial, marine, oil & gas and other off-highway applications.
Cummins also produced a 650 hp and 1950 lb-ft version for the RV market.

History 
Until 2010 this engine was a dual overhead cam design with one cam actuating the injectors and the other the valve train. This injection system is known as HPI (high pressure injection) where the injectors are cam-actuated to create injection pressure. The fuel system uses an Integrated Fuel System Module (IFSM) with a lift pump, gear pump, pressure regulators, shutoff valve, metering and timing actuators to deliver fuel to the injectors. It has a one piece valve cover that is either plastic or on older models a chrome plated steel cover otherwise known as the Signature 600 or ISX CM570. 

In 2002, the ISX CM870 brought cooled exhaust gas recirculation (EGR) which takes exhaust gas and recirculates it back into the intake of the engine lowering the combustion chamber temperatures limiting the formation of NOx. 

In 2008, Cummins unveiled the ISX CM871, this engine featured a Diesel Particulate Filter (DPF) which trapped the particulate matter or "soot" produced in the engine. With the help of the Diesel Oxidation Catalyst (DOC) the soot trapped in the DPF is oxidized and turned to ash during a process called regeneration. In motorhomes this was available as a 600 or 650 HP version.

The current EPA 2010 version known as ISX15 CM2250 features enhanced Exhaust Gas Recirculation, Diesel Particulate Filter and Selective Catalytic Reduction (SCR), also known as Urea Injection. SCR consists of a Diesel Exhaust Fluid (DEF - composed of urea and water) injection system: holding tank, pump, controller, and injector and an SCR catalyst brick. DEF is heated, pumped and injected into a decomposition tube which then reacts with the exhaust reducing NOX. The ISX15 CM2250 and CM2350 has eliminated the injector camshaft due to the advent of the common rail fuel system in which the fuel is pressurized from a high pressure, multiple piston pump, transferred through tubing to a rail where fuel is stored under extremely high pressures up to 35,000 psi.

Models

Emissions Control 
The Cummins ISX diesel engine can be run in a dual fuel configuration, meaning it can properly operate on diesel fuel and natural gas. The burning of a natural gas alternative preserves diesel thermal efficiencies. The more efficient engine can produce less emissions in turn. The ISX can achieve this by altering ignition delay and injection timing. By examining the start of combustion (SOC), the engine's computer is able to employ a predictive ignition delay correlation. The predictive characteristics of the engine maximize both efficiency and useful power for the given fuel source. Compensations are made for the natural gas so that the power band and operating range are still functional for customers, while reducing emissions. Testing has also been done with the Cummins ISX by the EPA for natural gas usage that yielded results of major NOx emissions reduction. The configuration boasts ninety percent lower NOx emissions than the current EPA standard. This makes the Cummins ISX that burns natural gas one of the cleanest running diesel engines in the world.

The ISX also utilizes a DPF, or diesel particulate filter, required by the EPA. The DPF filters out the solid particles in the engine's exhaust, reducing tailpipe emissions. The DPF does have to be regularly maintained, however, because of its intricate design. The emissions control system will institute a filter regeneration which burns off the particulates. Any non-combustible materials found in lubrication additives will remain in the DPF, which can cause problems with back pressure and efficiency. This means the DPF needs to be regularly removed and cleaned for the Cummins ISX. An ash-less oil could mean that cleaning would be unnecessary, but can inhibit lubrication properties. A zero-phosphorus oil has been studied and found to be ideal for DPF systems and lubrication. The oil displays passing results for both piston deposits and oil consumption, which means the DPF system would be optimized with use of zero-phosphorus, ultra low sulfur oil.

The Cummins ISX also utilized DEF, or diesel exhaust fluid, in later models when EPA requirements changed. DEF is system of injected urea that reduces the emissions of a diesel engine. The Cummins ISX is required to have inhibitors in place for certain failures of the DEF system. When the DEF tank is low or empty, the ISX cuts power by twenty five percent. Power cuts and driver warnings are also used when the DEF system has been tampered with or is not functioning properly. Cummins has corrected several malfunctions and conducted customer based research of several million miles of on road use of the Cummins ISX to make the DEF system as functional as possible. The system is also required to de-rate power given any problems in order to reduce emissions to an absolute minimum.

Technology 
In early ISX engines an anti backlash gear train is used. The anti backlash gears allow the engine to operate with minimal gear rattle. Cummins uses a gear train in the front of the engine which is inherently noisy. The anti backlash gearing makes the engine less noisy due to the reduced rattle while in operation. The anti backlash gear train comes at a cost of efficiency. The Cummins ISX 15 model equipped with anti backlash gearing suffers a friction loss. The gears must overcome more friction throughout their moving range than a standard gear. A standard gear in a Cummins ISX 15 needs to overcome 0.75 Newton meters of torque, while the anti backlash gearing needs to overcome approximately 5 Newton meters of torque.

Cummins Signature Series 
Starting in 1998 the Cummins Signature was released to the Australian market to replace the out going N14. The Signature was produced up until 2003, In 2003 the highly popular Oceania exclusive was released this being the Gen 2 Cummins Signature. It built upon and improved on the original Cummins Signature. 2008 saw the third Signature revision this was the Signature EGR which utilized the same technology as the ISX EGR range. 2012 brought along the Gen 2 EGR line.

References 

Cummins diesel engines
Diesel engines by model
Straight-six engines